Joanna Kidman is a Māori sociology academic of Ngāti Maniapoto and Ngāti Raukawa  descent and as of 2019 is a full professor at  Victoria University of Wellington.

Academic career

After a 2001 PhD titled Travelling in the present historic: a case study of socialisation in an academic community in New Zealand at the Australian National University, Kidman moved to Victoria University of Wellington, rising to full professor.

In early June 2022, Kidman and fellow sociologist Professor Paul Spoonley were designated as the directors of the new Centre of Research Excellence for Preventing and Countering Violent Extremism. The research centre was established in line with the recommendations of the Royal Commission of Inquiry's report into the Christchurch mosque shootings to fund research and scholarships into countering terrorism and extremism.

Selected works 
 Kidman, Joanna, Eleanor Abrams, and Hiria McRae. "Imaginary subjects: school science, indigenous students, and knowledge–power relations". British Journal of Sociology of Education 32, no. 2 (2011): 203–220.
 Kidman, Joanna. Engaging with Māori communities: An exploration of some tensions in the mediation of social sciences research. Ngā Pae o te Māramatanga, 2007.
 Kidman, Joanna, Chiung-Fen Yen, and Eleanor Abrams. "Indigenous Students' Experiences of the Hidden Curriculum in Science Education: A Cross-National Study in New Zealand and Taiwan". International Journal of Science and Mathematics Education 11, no. 1 (2013): 43–64.
 Kidman, Joanna. "The land remains: Māori youth and the politics of belonging". AlterNative: An International Journal of Indigenous Peoples 8, no. 2 (2012): 189–202.

References

External links
 

Living people
Academic staff of the Victoria University of Wellington
New Zealand women academics
New Zealand Māori academics
New Zealand Māori women academics
Year of birth missing (living people)
New Zealand women writers